SCOM Mikishi is a Congolese football club based in Lubumbashi.

The club have played many season in Linafoot and in 1991 the team has won the title.

Stadium
Their home games are played at Stade Kibassa Maliba.

Honours
Linafoot
 Winners (1): 1991

Performance in CAF competitions
African Cup of Champions Clubs/CAF Champions League: 1 appearance
1992 - First round

References

External links
Worldfootball

Football clubs in the Democratic Republic of the Congo
Football clubs in Lubumbashi
Sports clubs in the Democratic Republic of the Congo